Narsingdi-1 is a constituency represented in the Jatiya Sangsad (National Parliament) of Bangladesh since 2008 by Muhammad Nazrul Islam of the Awami League.

Boundaries 
The constituency encompasses all but three union parishads of Narsingdi Sadar Upazila: Amdia, Meher Para, and Panchdona.

History 
The constituency was created in 1984 from a Dhaka constituency when the former Dhaka District was split into six districts: Manikganj, Munshiganj, Dhaka, Gazipur, Narsingdi, and Narayanganj.

Ahead of the 2008 general election, the Election Commission redrew constituency boundaries to reflect population changes revealed by the 2001 Bangladesh census. The 2008 redistricting altered the boundaries of the constituency.

Ahead of the 2014 general election, the Election Commission expanded the boundaries of the constituency. Previously it excluded a fourth union parishad of Narsingdi Sadar Upazila: Silmandi.

Members of Parliament

Elections

Elections in the 2010s

Elections in the 2000s 

Shamsuddin Ahmed Ishaq died in March 2005. Khairul Islam Khokon of the BNP was elected in a June by-election.

Elections in the 1990s

References

External links
 

Parliamentary constituencies in Bangladesh
Narsingdi District